The Oakville Buzz are Canadian box lacrosse team from Oakville, Ontario, Canada that play in the Ontario Junior A Lacrosse League.  The Buzz played in the OLA Junior B Lacrosse League from 2001-2018.  The Buzz won the 2006 Founders Cup Canadian Junior B National Champions.

History
The Oakville Buzz were founded in 2001.  In 2005, they were often thought to be next in line to win the National Title.  These dreams were squashed by the surging Elora Mohawks squad in the League Finals.

2006 playoff run
Finishing the 2006 season 19-1-0, their only loss came at the hands of the Mimico Mountaineers late in the season.  The first round pitted them against the Halton Hills Bulldogs, whom they swept in three games.  The Quarter-final was against Scarborough Saints, another three game sweep.  The Conference Final was against Mimico Mountaineers, a third straight sweep.  The Final was against the Orangeville Northmen.  Oakville took Games 1 and 2 10-5 and 8-6.  Orangeville gasped for breath in Game 3, handing the Buzz their second loss of the campaign 8-7.  The Buzz shut the Northmen down in Game 4, but it was a close 5-1 game.  The Buzz won their first ever league title and a trip to their first Founders Cup, to take place in Windsor, Ontario.

On August 23, the Buzz squared off against the Sherbrooke Jr. Extrême in their first ever national level game.  The Buzz did not disappoint, winning 16-2.  Their second game was a 19-5 win against the Saskatoon Smash the next night.  Their third game was a 12-3 victory against the Calgary Shamrocks to clinch the pool's first seed.  Their semi-final game was against the Calgary Shamrocks again, crushing them 21-9.  This set up an All-Ontario Founders Cup Final between the Buzz and the Windsor Fratmen.  The Fratmen finished the OLA regular season with a 13-6-1 record, winning their division.  Despite the early tournament prowess of the Fratmen, the Buzz eased their way into a 10-4 victory to win their first ever Founders Cup National Title.

Season-by-season results
Note: GP = Games played, W = Wins, L = Losses, T = Ties, Pts = Points, GF = Goals for, GA = Goals against

Founders Cup
CANADIAN NATIONAL CHAMPIONSHIPS

Top 10 All Time Buzz Scoring (to end 2018)

References

External links

http://www.wampsbibleoflacrosse.com/
Unofficial OLA Page

Oakville, Ontario
Ontario Lacrosse Association teams